BOOM Festival was a rock music festival held annually throughout SFR Yugoslavia between 1972 and 1978. The festival was held for the first time in 1972 in Ljubljana, and for the last time in 1978 in Novi Sad. The festival featured numerous prominent acts of the Yugoslav rock scene, and five various artists live albums were recorded on various editions of the festival. Most of the editions of the festival were sponsored by the League of Socialist Youth of Yugoslavia.

History

See also
List of historic rock festivals
List of jam band music festivals

References

Music festivals in Yugoslavia
Rock festivals in Slovenia
Rock festivals in Croatia
Rock festivals in Serbia
Yugoslav rock music
Serbian rock music
Music festivals established in 1972
Recurring events disestablished in 1978